Dogovor iz 1804. (trans. The 1804 Agreement) was a Yugoslav rock band formed in Belgrade in 1968. Although short-lived, the band is notable as one of the pioneers of the Yugoslav progressive and psychedelic rock scenes.

History

1968-1970
The band was formed in November 1968 by Nebojša "Nebe" Ignjatović (acoustic guitar, piano, flute, vocals), Robert Nemeček (bass guitar), Branislav Markovic (sitar, flute, guitar), Aleksandar Stajić (guitar, flue), Dejan Vasiljević (double bass), Stevan Milutinović (drums) and Aleksandar Farebnaher (tabla). Their name alluded to the beginning of the First Serbian Uprising in 1804.

Dogovor iz 1804. was one of the first Yugoslav bands to move away from beat and rhythm and blues towards more progressive sound with influences of music from various cultures. They were also one of the first Yugoslav bands to perform their own material exclusively. The largest part of the material was composed by Nebojša Ignjatović. The band had notable performances on the 1969 Subotica Youth Festival and Belgrade Guitar Festival. Their song "Sećanje na san" ("Memory of a Dream") was released on the 7" single Gitarijada 69 (Guitar Festival 69) by Beograd Disk, alongside the song "Tužan sam kad kiša pada" ("I'm Sad when It Rains") by the band Exodusi. The band recorded demos for the songs "Krug" ("The Circle"), "Vetar" ("The Wind"), "S one strane oblika" ("On the Other Side of Shapes"), today awailable on YouTube, but never officially released. Having one of their last performances at the 1970 Belgrade Spring festival, the band ended their activity in 1970.

Post breakup
After the group disbanded Robert Nemeček moved to Džentlmeni, and in 1972 was among the forming members of the progressive/hard rock band Pop Mašina, with which he achieved large popularity.

Nebojša Ignjatović graduated and later got a magister degree from the Belgrade Faculty of Music Arts. He worked as a professor on the Faculty of Music Arts and played double bass in the Belgrade Philharmonic Orchestra. In the 1990s he took part in the Rubber Soul Project.

Stevan Milutinović would play in the bands Dah and Gordi.

The song "Sećanje na san" was released in 1994 on the Komuna compilation album Plima: Progresivna muzika (The Tide: Progressive Music) as a part of the YU retROCKspektiva (YU RetROCKspective) album series.

Discography
"Sećanje na san" (Gitarijada 69, 1969)

References

External links
Dogovor iz 1804. at Discogs

Serbian progressive rock groups
Serbian psychedelic rock music groups
Yugoslav progressive rock groups
Yugoslav psychedelic rock music groups
Musical groups from Belgrade
Musical groups established in 1968
Musical groups disestablished in 1970